Joseph P. Proksa (June 30, 1914 – October 25, 1999) was an American professional basketball player. Proksa played in the National Basketball League for one game, appearing for the Pittsburgh Raiders during the 1944–45 season. Later, he coached high school basketball in Pennsylvania and in Maryland.

References

1914 births
1999 deaths
American men's basketball players
United States Navy personnel of World War II
Basketball players from Pennsylvania
Guards (basketball)
High school basketball coaches in Maryland
High school basketball coaches in Pennsylvania
Penn State Nittany Lions basketball players
Pittsburgh Raiders players
Sportspeople from Hagerstown, Maryland